Assiminea is a genus of minute, salt-tolerant snails with an operculum, aquatic gastropod mollusks, or micromollusks, in the family Assimineidae.

Distribution and habitat
These snails can be found worldwide. They live usually in brackish water and salt marshes of tropical and temperate regions, at beaches, in water and at land.

Description
These are very small to medium large snails, between 2 and 13 mm). Some adults do not exceed a size of 3 mm. The shape of the thin shells is somewhat ovately conical. The margin of the aperture is simple. The operculum is in most cases horny. The eyes are at the end of short, stout stalks. They feed on vegetable detritus and small algae. They lay their eggs in the mud, and hatch as free-swimming larvae.

Species
According to the World Register of Marine Species, the following species with valid names are included within the genus Assiminea :
 
 Assiminea aurifera Preston, 1912
 Assiminea avilai van Aartsen, 2008
 Assiminea beddomiana Nevill, 1881
 Assiminea bella Kuroda, 1958
 Assiminea cienegensis Hershler, H.-P. Liu & Lang, 2007
 Assiminea compacta (Carpenter, 1864)
 Assiminea cornea (Leith, 1853)
 Assiminea dubiosa (C.B. Adams, 1852)
 Assiminea estuarina Habe, 1946
 Assiminea fasciata (F. Krauss, 1848)
 Assiminea geayi Lamy, 1910
 Assiminea gittenbergeri van Aartsen, 2008
 Assiminea glaubrechti van Aartsen, 2008
 Assiminea globulus Connoly, 1939
 Assiminea grayana Fleming, 1828
 Assiminea hessei O. Boettger, 1887
 Assiminea hiradoensis Habe, 1942
 Assiminea hungerfordiana G. Nevill, 1880 (taxon inquirendum)
 † Assiminea isoceles Connolly, 1939 
 Assiminea japonica Martens, 1877
 Assiminea keniana D. S. Brown, 1980
 Assiminea knysnaensis (F. Krauss, 1848)
 Assiminea lucida Pease, 1869
 Assiminea lugubris Turton, 1932
 Assiminea lutea (A. Adams, 1861)
 Assiminea mesopotamica Glöer, Naser & Yasser, 2007
 Assiminea moroccoensis Rolán, 2013
 Assiminea navigatorum Benthem Jutting, 1963
 Assiminea nitida (Pease, 1865): this species belongs to the genus Paludinella as has been demonstrated by Thiele (1927, p. 128), because of a different dentition and an open umbilicus
 Assiminea occulta Rolán, 2013
 Assiminea ovata (Krauss, 1848) 
 Assiminea palauensis Thiele, 1927
 Assiminea parasitologica Kuroda, 1958
 Assiminea parvula (Mousson, 1865)
 Assiminea parvula Morelet, 1877
 Assiminea pecos Taylor, 1987 (pecos assiminea)
 Assiminea possietica Golikov & Kussakin in Golikov & Scarlato, 1967
 Assiminea principensis Rolán, 2013
 Assiminea punctum Morelet, 1882
  Assiminea relata Cotton, 1942
 Assiminea rolani van Aartsen, 2008
 Assiminea saotomensis Rolán, 2013
 Assiminea savesi (Crosse, 1888)
 Assiminea schlickumi Brandt, 1974
 Assiminea schuetti Brandt, 1974
 Assiminea senegalensis Rolán, 2013
 Assiminea sinensis Nevill, 1880
 Assiminea subeffusa O. Boettger, 1887
 Assiminea succinea (Pfeiffer, 1840) : Atlantic assiminea
 † Assiminea tergestina Stache, 1889 
 Assiminea theobaldiana Nevill, 1880
 Assiminea translucens (Carpenter, 1864)
 Assiminea umlaasiana (E.A. Smith, 1902)
 Assiminea violacea Heude, 1882
 Assiminea vulgaris (Webster, 1905)
 † Assiminea waitemata Laws, 1950 
 Assiminea woodmasoniana G. Nevill, 1880
 Assiminea yoshidayukioi Kuroda, 1959
 Assiminea zilchi Brandt, 1974
 Assiminea zubairensis Glöer & Naser, 2013

The Indo-Pacific Molluscan Database also includes the following species with names in current use :
 Assiminea interrupta Dautzenberg & Fischer, 1905
 Assiminea septentrionalis Habe, 1942
The database ITIS also mentions the following species :
 Assiminea auberiana Orbigny, 1842
Species brought into synonymy
 Assiminea affinis Böttger, 1887: synonym of Taiwanassiminea affinis (Böttger, 1887)
 Assiminea affinis Mousson, 1874: synonym of Cryptassiminea buccinoides (Quoy & Gaimard, 1834)
 Assiminea andrewsiana E. A. Smith, 1900: synonym of Angustassiminea andrewsiana (E. A. Smith, 1900) (original combination)
 Assiminea angustata Pilsbry, 1901: synonym of Ansola angustata (Pilsbry, 1901)
 Assiminea antipodum Filhol, 1880 : synonym of Laevilitorina antipodum (Filhol, 1880)
 Assiminea australis Petterd, 1889: synonym of Cryptassiminea buccinoides (Quoy & Gaimard, 1834)
 Assiminea australis Thiele, 1927: synonym of Assiminea brevicula (Pfeiffer, 1855)
 Assiminea bedaliensis Rensch, 1934: synonym of Taiwanassiminea bedaliensis (Rensch, 1934)
 Assiminea beddomeana Nevill, 1880: synonym of Austropilula beddomeana (Nevill, 1880) (original combination)
 Assiminea bicincta Petterd, 1889: synonym of Cryptassiminea buccinoides (Quoy & Gaimard, 1834)
 Assiminea bifasciata Nevill, 1880: synonym of Assiminea ovata (Krauss, 1848)
 Assiminea brevicula]' (Pfeiffer, 1854): synonym of Optediceros breviculum (Pfeiffer, 1855)
 Assiminea buccinoides (Quoy and Gaimard, 1834): synonym of Cryptassiminea buccinoides (Quoy & Gaimard, 1834)
 Assiminea caledonica (Crosse, 1869): synonym of Crossilla caledonica (Crosse, 1869)
 Assiminea californica (Tryon, 1865): California assiminea : synonym of Angustassiminea californica (Tryon, 1865)
 Assiminea capensis Bartsch, 1915: synonym of Assiminea ovata (Krauss, 1848)
 Assiminea carinata I. Lea, 1856: synonym of Cyclotropis carinata (I. Lea, 1856) (original combination)
 Assiminea castanea Westerlund, 1883: synonym of Angustassiminea castanea (Westerlund, 1883)
 † Assiminea conoidea von Koenen, 1882 : synonym of † Peringia conoidea (von Koenen, 1882)  (new combination)
 † Assiminea contracta Cossmann, 1888 : synonym of † Peringia contracta (Cossmann, 1888)  (new combination)
 Assiminea corpulenta van Benthem Jutting, 1963: synonym of Paludinella corpulenta (van Benthem Jutting, 1963) (original combination)
 † Assiminea crassa Etheridge, 1879: synonym of † Littoridina crassa (Etheridge, 1879)  (new combination)
 Assiminea creutzbergi De Jong & Coomans, 1988: synonym of Barleeia creutzbergi (De Jong & Coomans, 1988)
 † Assiminea distinguenda Cossmann, 1899: synonym of † Peringia distinguenda (Cossmann, 1899) (new combination)
 Assiminea dohrniana G. Nevill, 1880: synonym of Ovassiminea dohrniana (G. Nevill, 1880) (original combination)
 † Assiminea eburnoides Cossmann, 1888: synonym of † Emmericia eburnoides (Cossmann, 1888)  (new combination)
 † Assiminea elatior Cossmann, 1907: synonym of † Lapparentia elatior (Cossmann, 1907)  (new combination)
 Assiminea gerhardtae De Jong & Coomans, 1988: synonym of Caelatura gerhardtae (De Jong & Coomans, 1988)
 † Assiminea gottscheana von Koenen, 1882: synonym of † Peringia gottscheana (von Koenen, 1882)  (new combination)
 Assiminea granum Morelet, 1882: synonym of Paludinella hidalgoi f. granum (Morelet, 1882) (original combination)
 Assiminea hayasii Habe, 1942: synonym of Taiwanassiminea hayasii (Habe, 1942)
 Assiminea hidalgoi (Gassies, 1869): synonym of Paludinella hidalgoi (Gassies, 1869) (superseded combination)
 Assiminea infima Berry, 1947 (badwater snail): synonym of Angustassiminea infima (S. S. Berry, 1947) (original combination)
 Assiminea kushimotoensis Kuroda, 1958: synonym of Angustassiminea castanea (Westerlund, 1883)
 Assiminea latericea H. Adams & A. Adams, 1864: synonym of Pseudomphala latericea (H. Adams & A. Adams, 1864) (original combination)
 Assiminea lentula van Benthem Jutting, 1963: synonym of Taiwanassiminea lentula (van Benthem Jutting, 1963)
 Assiminea leptodonta Connolly, 1922: synonym of Eussoia leptodonta (Connolly, 1922) (correction of original combination)
 Assiminea lirata Turton, 1932: synonym of Tomichia tristis (Morelet, 1889) (junior synonym)
 Assiminea littorina (Delle Chiaje, 1828) sensu Philippi, 1841: synonym of Paludinella globularis (Hanley in Thorpe, 1844)
 Assiminea microsculpta Nevill, 1880: synonym of Sculptassiminea microsculpta (Nevill, 1880) (original combination)
 Assiminea miniata Martens, 1866: synonym of Assiminea brevicula (Pfeiffer, 1855): synonym of Optediceros breviculum (Pfeiffer, 1855) (junior synonym)
 Assiminea miyazakii Habe, 1943: synonym of Pseudomphala miyazakii (Habe, 1943) (original combination)
 † Assiminea nicolasi Roman, 1912: synonym of † Hydrobia nicolasi (Roman, 1912)  (new combination)
 Assiminea pagodella Hedley, 1903: synonym of Ascorhis victoriae (Tenison-Woods, 1878)
 Assiminea philippinica Boettger, 1887: synonym of Metassiminea philippinica (Boettger, 1887) (basionym)
 Assiminea queenslandica Thiele, 1927: synonym of Taiwanassiminea affinis (Böttger, 1887)
 Assiminea recta Mousson, 1874: synonym of Peringia ulvae (Pennant, 1777)
 Assiminea riparia van Benthem Jutting, 1963: synonym of Taiwanassiminea riparia (van Benthem Jutting, 1963)
 Assiminea rubella Blanford, 1867: synonym of Assiminea brevicula (Pfeiffer, 1855): synonym of Optediceros breviculum (Pfeiffer, 1855) (junior synonym)
 Assiminea rufostrigata Hesse, 1916: synonym of Pontiturboella rufostrigata (Hesse, 1916)
 Assiminea satsumana Habe, 1942: synonym of Angustassiminea satsumana (Habe, 1942) (original combination)
 Assiminea sororcula van Benthem Jutting, 1963: synonym of Taiwanassiminea sororcula (van Benthem Jutting, 1963)
 † Assiminea stenochora Cossmann, 1888: synonym of † Lapparentia stenochora (Cossmann, 1888) (new combination)
 Assiminea tasmanica Tenison-Woods, 1876: synonym of Cryptassiminea buccinoides (Quoy & Gaimard, 1834)
 Assiminea tyttha Melvill & Ponsonby, 1897: synonym of Hydrocena noticola Benson, 1856

References
 Fleming, J. 1828. A history of British animals, exhibiting the descriptive characters and systematic arrangement of the genera and species of quadrupeds, birds, reptiles, fishes, Mollusca, and Radiata of the United Kingdom; including the indigenous, extirpated, and extinct kinds, together with periodical and occasional visitants. - pp. i-xxxii [= 1-23], 1-565, [1]. Edinburgh. (Bell & Bradfute).
 Knight G.A.F. 1900. The etymology of the names Azeca and Assiminea of Leach. Journal of Conchology, 9: 271-276 
 R. Tucker Abbott, The Gastropod Genus Assiminea in the Philippines; Proceedings of the Academy of Natural Sciences of Philadelphia Vol. 110 (1958), pp. 213–278
 Vaught, K.C. (1989). A classification of the living Mollusca. American Malacologists: Melbourne, FL (USA). . XII, 195 pp. 
 Gofas, S.; Le Renard, J.; Bouchet, P. (2001). Mollusca, in: Costello, M.J. et al. (Ed.) (2001). European register of marine species: a check-list of the marine species in Europe and a bibliography of guides to their identification. Collection Patrimoines Naturels, 50: pp. 180–213
 Gofas, S.; Afonso, J.P.; Brandào, M. (Ed.). (S.a.). Conchas e Moluscos de Angola = Coquillages et Mollusques d'Angola. [Shells and molluscs of Angola].'' Universidade Agostinho / Elf Aquitaine Angola: Angola. 140 pp. 
 van Aartsen (2008). Basteria 72 (4-6) : 165-181

Assimineidae
Taxonomy articles created by Polbot
Gastropod genera